Henry Frederick William Fehlandt (December 20, 1851 – October 18, 1928) was a German-born American farmer, businessman, and politician.

Biography 
Born in Picher, Germany, Fehlandt emigrated to the United States and settled in the town of Roxbury, Dane County, Wisconsin in 1865. He married Frederica Reese in 1877. He was a farmer in the town of Berry, Wisconsin. He served on the Berry Town Board and was chairman of the town board. He also served on the Dane County Board of Supervisors.

In 1889, Fehllandt served in the Wisconsin State Assembly and was a Democrat. From 1891 to 1895, Fehlandt served as clerk of the Wisconsin Circuit Court for Dane County. He also served as jury commissioner for Dane County. In 1905, Fehlandt sold his farm and moved to Madison, Wisconsin. He was involved with the Dane County Agricultural Society and with the fire insurance business. Fehlandt was a Democrat.

Fehlandt died in Madison, Wisconsin.

References

External links

1851 births
1928 deaths
German emigrants to the United States
People from Dane County, Wisconsin
Businesspeople from Wisconsin
Farmers from Wisconsin
Wisconsin city council members
Mayors of places in Wisconsin
County supervisors in Wisconsin
People from Mecklenburg-Schwerin
People from Madison, West Virginia
Democratic Party members of the Wisconsin State Assembly